Neutral or neutrality may refer to:

Mathematics and natural science

Biology
 Neutral organisms, in ecology, those that obey the unified neutral theory of biodiversity

Chemistry and physics
 Neutralization (chemistry), a chemical reaction in which an acid and a base react quantitatively with each other
 Neutral solution, a chemical solution which is neither acidic nor basic
 Neutral particle, a particle without electrical charge

Mathematics
 Neutral element or identity element, in mathematics, a special element with respect to a binary operation, such that if the operation is applied to any element in a set, that element is unchanged
 Neutral vector, a multivariate random variable that exhibits a particular type of statistical independence (Dirichlet distribution)

Philosophy

 Neutrality (philosophy), the absence of declared or intentional bias
 Neutrality (psychoanalysis)
 Neutral level, the physical or material traces of esthesic and poietic processes identified in semiotics

Politics 
 Neutral country, a polity such as a state that favors or supports none of the parties involved in a disagreement, conflict, or war

Political principles
 Neutral point of view, a stance or tone that is free from bias (see journalistic objectivity)
 Gender neutrality, a principle which advocates gender equality practices and behaviors which are neutral in regard to gender
 Humanitarian neutrality, a principle governing humanitarian responses
 Medical neutrality, a principle of noninterference with medical services in times of armed conflict and civil unrest
 Network neutrality, a principle which advocates that all data on the Internet be treated equally
 Search neutrality, a principle that search engines should have no editorial policies other than that their results be comprehensive, impartial and based solely on relevance
Neutrality (social choice), a principle that a voting rule should not discriminate apriori between candidates.

Other uses in politics
 Neutrality of money, the notion that a change in the supply of money in an economy has no tangible effects
 Neutral Nation, a group of Native Americans
 Neutral Bajwa, When an army chief surrenders on a threat letter from a foreign country by compromising country's sovereignty, is called neutral Bajwa

Technology
 Neutral (usually abbreviated "N"), the state where no gears are selected for a motor vehicle's transmission
 Neutral wire, a conductor that provides a low impedance path to earth

Arts and media
 Neutrality (film), a 1949 Spanish drama
 Neutral alignment, a categorization of the moral and ethical perspective of some characters, creatures and societies in some role-playing games
 Neutral (Dungeons & Dragons), an alignment in the Dungeons & Dragons fantasy role-playing game
 Neutral Records, a record label

Other uses 
 Neutral, Kansas, a community in the United States
 Neutral color, a description sometimes used to characterise the color gray

See also 
Impartiality
Neuter (disambiguation)
Nutter (disambiguation)